The Affair is an American television drama series created by Sarah Treem and Hagai Levi. The series premiered on Showtime on October 12, 2014. Its second season premiered on October 4, 2015. On December 9, 2015, the series was renewed for a third season, which debuted on November 20, 2016. On January 9, 2017, Showtime renewed the series for a fourth season, which premiered on June 17, 2018. The series was renewed for a fifth and final season which debuted on August 25, 2019.

Series overview

Episodes

Season 1 (2014)

Season 2 (2015)

Season 3 (2016–17)

Season 4 (2018)

Season 5 (2019)

Ratings

References

External links

Lists of American drama television series episodes